Jovan Ilić (Cyrillic: Јован Илић ) can refer to:

 Jovan Ilić (1824—1901), Serbian writer and a politician
 Jovan Ilić (bishop) (1884—1975), bishop of the Serbian Orthodox Church
 Jovan Ilić (geographer) (1928—2009), Serbian geography professor